The 2016 NCAA Division I Indoor Track and Field Championships was the 52nd NCAA Men's Division I Indoor Track and Field Championships and the 35th NCAA Women's Division I Indoor Track and Field Championships, held at the Birmingham CrossPlex in Birmingham, Alabama near the campus of the host school, the University of Alabama at Birmingham. In total, thirty-two different men's and women's indoor track and field events were contested from March 11 to March 12, 2016.

Results

Men's results

60 meters
Final results shown, not prelims

200 meters
Final results shown, not prelims

400 meters
Final results shown, not prelims

800 meters
Final results shown, not prelims

1500 meters
Final results shown, not prelims

3000 meters
Final results shown, not prelims

See also
 NCAA Men's Division I Indoor Track and Field Championships 
 NCAA Women's Division I Indoor Track and Field Championships

References
 

NCAA Indoor Track and Field Championships
NCAA Division I Indoor Track and Field Championships
NCAA Division I Indoor Track and Field Championships
NCAA Division I Indoor Track and Field Championships
NCAA Division I Indoor Track and Field Championships